Clean fuel may refer to type of fuel used for transport or a type of fuel used for cooking and lighting. With regards to cooking, the Sustainable Development Goal 7 aims to "Ensure access to affordable, reliable, sustainable and modern energy for all." Clean fuel there is defined by the emission rate targets and specific fuel recommendations (i.e. against unprocessed coal and kerosene) included in the normative guidance WHO guidelines for indoor air quality. Clean fuel is one component of sustainable energy.

Transport 
Clean fuels used for transport can be biofuels that have lower greenhouse gas emission rates, such as ethanol or biodiesel biogas. Liquefied petroleum gas (LPG) is another example.

Cooking and lighting 
Clean fuels used for cooking and lighting can include biogas, LPG, electricity, ethanol, natural gas. Furthermore, clean-burning stoves, solar cookers and alcohol-fuel stoves are cooking solutions that typically deliver high performance in terms of reducing indoor air pollution. This is often the case even regardless of the type of cookstove used. These cooking solutions are often considered “modern” or “clean” solutions and are collectively called BLEENS.

Sustainable Development Goal 7 is one of 17 Sustainable Development Goals established by the United Nations General Assembly in 2015. It aims to "Ensure access to affordable, reliable, sustainable and modern energy for all." One of its indicators is: "Proportion of population with primary reliance on clean fuels and technology" (Indicator 7.1.2). The indicator is calculated as the number of people using clean fuels and technologies for cooking, heating and lighting divided by total population reporting that any cooking, heating or lighting, expressed as percentage. "Clean fuel" is defined by the emission rate targets and specific fuel recommendations (i.e. against unprocessed coal and kerosene) included in the normative guidance WHO guidelines for indoor air quality.

There remain some 2.8 billion people who rely on unclean, polluting fuels and technologies for cooking. This includes traditional stoves paired with charcoal, coal, crop waste, dung, kerosene, and wood. The World Health Organization estimates that air pollution from cooking causes 3.8 million deaths annually. These fuels also emit significant amounts of black carbon and methane, which are potent contributors to climate change, in addition to carbon dioxide.

See also
Climate Change
Natural Gas Vehicle

References

External 

 Science Direct Topic Clean Fuel
 Washington Environmental Council Clean Fuel Standard

Fuels
Sustainable energy
Energy development